The Laysan hedyleptan moth (Omiodes laysanensis) is a species of moth in the family Crambidae. It is endemic to Laysan in the Northwestern Hawaiian Islands.

The larvae are thought to feed on grasses.

References

Sources

Omiodes
Endemic moths of Hawaii
Natural history of the Northwestern Hawaiian Islands
Moths described in 1914
Taxonomy articles created by Polbot